Hayfork Creek is a tributary of the South Fork Trinity River in Northern California in the United States. It winds through a generally steep and narrow course north, then west through the forested Klamath Mountains, but also passes through the Hayfork and Hyampom Valleys, which are the primary agricultural regions of Trinity County.

Human habitation in the basin goes back more than 5,000 years. The watershed of the creek was originally inhabited by the Wintu people. The first Euro-Americans arrived in the late 1820s, but the basin was not developed until the 1850s with the onset of the California Gold Rush. The fertile soils and mild climate of the river valley led to it becoming the most prosperous agricultural area of the county. Logging began in the 1920s, and by the 1940s started to have an adverse impact on the ecology of the watershed, which includes once-abundant populations of Coho salmon and steelhead trout.

Course
Flowing generally north through a deep forested valley in the Shasta-Trinity National Forest, it receives the East Fork from the right. Five miles (8 km) downstream, it enters the Hayfork Valley, a large agricultural basin in the middle of the Klamath Mountains. Here it receives Summit and Big Creeks from the right, while Salt Creek enters from the left. The stream also passes State Route 3 and the small town of Hayfork.

Winding northwest out of the valley, the creek enters a steep gorge, plunging over whitewater rapids and around giant boulders between narrow cliffs. At the Miners Creek confluence from the right, Hayfork Creek turns west and shortly afterwards receives Corral Creek, also from the right. Approximately a mile (1.6 km) above the mouth, the river spills out of the mountains into the town of Hyampom in the Hyampom Valley.

Discharge
The U.S. Geological Survey had a stream gauge on Hayfork Creek at Hyampom from 1954 to 1974. During the twenty years of record, the average discharge at the mouth was  calculated from monthly mean discharges. There was also a gauge at Hayfork from 1956 to 1976.

Watershed
Hayfork Creek drains a mountainous, remote watershed of  situated entirely within southern Trinity County. Although the majority of the basin is covered by the Klamath Mountains, it also contains some of Trinity County's only significant amounts of arable land in the Hayfork and Hyampom Valleys. About 78.6% of the watershed or  lies within public lands, mostly owned by the U.S. Forest Service. The remaining 21.4% is private land, mainly used for cattle ranching and farming.

The Hayfork Creek watershed divide separates it from several other river valleys. The entire western boundary lies along the divide with the South Fork Trinity River. To the northwest lies the valley of the main stem of the Trinity River. In the east, a long ridge separates the Hayfork basin from the Sacramento Valley, specifically the headwaters of a stream, Cottonwood Creek, which drains to the Sacramento River.

The geography of the watershed is widely varied, from subalpine in the Chanchellula Wilderness and on Hayfork Bally down to hot, dry scrub and chaparral in the lower river valley. The dominant vegetation type is mixed conifer-hardwood forest, with common species including douglas-fir, ponderosa and grey pine, California black oak, canyon live oak, common and hairy manzanita, and huckleberry oak, as well as many riparian species including bigleaf maple, Pacific dogwood, white alder, and black cottonwood. Hayfork Valley consists mainly of oak and grey pine woodlands and grasslands, although much of this has been altered to accommodate housing and agriculture. In the valley, the creek suffers from high water temperatures and contamination due to ranching along the stream's banks and water diversions from tributaries. In some places the creek went subsurface in 2014 at the height of the drought. There are many small diversions from the tributaries, both legal and illegal. The biggest diversion is from Big Creek north of Hayfork, which diverts water for Big Creek Ranch and Ewing Reservoir, Hayfork's water supply. The water district is authorized to divert water from December 1st until June 1st of each winter, and they slowly deplete the reservoir all summer. 

The only significant town along the creek is Hayfork, with a population of about 2,368. Hyampom, with 241, is the only other Census Designated Place, although only about 1/4 of Hyampom's population lives in the Hayfork Creek watershed. Other settlements in the watershed are Peanut, population 73, and Wildwood, with 64. Hayfork is the second largest town in Trinity County after Weaverville, the county seat, and is central to the Hayfork Valley, the primary agricultural region in Trinity County. Other towns within the basin include Peanut, which is located on Salt Creek, and Wildwood, situated near the headwaters of the Hayfork. The total human population of the watershed is approximately 2,750-3,000 which amounts to 7.3-7.9 people per square mile. If you subtract the 2368 people who live in Hayfork, it becomes 1-1.7 people per square mile.

Geology
The stream flows through an area of the Klamath Mountains created by uplift caused by the collision of multiple exotic terranes (in this case, a fragment of uplifted crust formed by tectonic activity on the Pacific Plate) with the North American plate. The resulting buckling stress caused the formation of the mountain ranges of northwestern California in stages. Hayfork Creek runs across the western part of the Hayfork Terrane, which was formed about 165 million years ago by plutonic activity beneath the Pacific Plate, and collided with the North American Plate sometime between 140 and 120 million years ago. By the mid-Paleocene, approximately 59 million years ago, the Klamath Mountains first rose; erosion and orogeny occurred over time continuing to this day, with the last great mountain-building period in the Pleistocene, about 1.6 million years ago. It is believed that the present course of the stream had been established prior to the formation of the mountains – as they rose, the creek's erosional force cut canyons and valleys into the bedrock, maintaining its course.

Approximately  of the alluvium dates from the Holocene less than 12,000 years ago.

History
The Wintu Native American tribe (specifically the Nor-El-Muk or Hayfork Wintu, one of six major divisions of the tribe) lived along Hayfork Creek. The range of the Wintu extended roughly through the highlands and mountains of the upper Hayfork Creek basin bordering on the Hayfork Valley, although archaeological sites containing spearheads and arrowheads have been discovered as far downstream as Hyampom. The Wintu established permanent winter camps on streams, and during the spring and summer traveled to farther and higher-elevation areas to hunt. The staple food of the Native Americans was salmon, which thrived in abundance in the rivers of the region. Other important foods included, acorn various types of berries or small game.

The first outsider to see Hayfork Creek was fur trapper Jedediah Smith in the dawn of 1828, who was leading an expedition from northern California into Oregon. Their route took them up Hayfork Creek, the South Fork Trinity River, and the Trinity and Klamath Rivers before they arrived on the far north Pacific coast of California. However, the party did not stay in the area for long. The route along lower Hayfork Creek that Smith and his men had taken later became a trade path between the Central Valley and coastal Oregon.

Following the California Gold Rush, in which gold was discovered along the Trinity River in 1848, Americans began to settle the Hayfork Valley and because of its abundant water, mild climate and fertile soils it quickly became the most productive agricultural area or the "breadbasket" of Trinity County. Miners worked claims along the upper section of the creek and along some of its headwaters tributaries. In 1851, the town of Hayfork was first established, and was originally named Kingsberrys. The town boomed because of the valley's rapidly improving economy, reaching a population of 1,200 by 1860. The Hyampom Valley, while smaller than the Hayfork Valley, has similar qualities and the first permanent European settlements were built in the 1860s.

After his body was found, a searching party tracked the natives to their camp on the confluence of Bridge Gulch and Hayfork Creek, the former of which is spanned by a natural bridge made infamous from the impending events. About 70 whites set out from Weaverville within a week of the murder, and killed 153 of the 158 Native Americans in what became known as the Bridge Gulch Massacre.

Ecology
Historically Hayfork Creek was one of the more productive steelhead and salmon streams of the Trinity River basin. Agricultural runoff since the late 1800s has hurt the ecosystem of the creek downstream of Hayfork, which is the largest farming region of the watershed. Logging, as well as land clearing for ranching and grazing, has caused increased amounts of sediments to wash into the stream, clouding the water and endangering fish populations. The upper section of the creek is polluted from acid mine drainage, most notably from the Kelly Mine on McCovey Gulch, which issues significant amounts of chromium and arsenic. In recent years, the temperature of the creek near the mouth has risen above  in dry summers, posing fatal conditions to fish. Records show a high mortality rate of female salmon and recurring fish kills, probably caused by the high temperatures and the clouding of water by contaminants and sediments that wash down from agricultural and built-up areas.

One of the biggest problems for the watershed is the loss of forested lands. Although timberland loss is more pronounced in the South Fork Trinity valley than the Hayfork basin, suspended sediment loads in the creek have been rising above ecologically safe limits since 1944. The underlying rock in the Hayfork Creek watershed is generally stable, but erosion has increased because of the construction of roads. There are several species of endangered or threatened animals that live within the watershed, including the Northern spotted owl and peregrine falcon. The Hayfork Creek valley also provides a major component of the flight path of migratory birds travelling between the Pacific coast and the Sacramento Valley.

Tourism and recreation
The creek is known throughout Trinity County for its recreational gold mining. Reputedly some of the best spots for mining in Northern California lie along the Hayfork upstream of the Hayfork Valley and below Wildwood. The geology of the stream bed is described as a "natural gold trap" and recent strikes have been made there of up to 60 ounces in one day.

See also
List of rivers of California

References

Works cited
Gudde, Erwin G.; Bright, William (2004). California Place Names: The Origin and Etymology of Current Geographical Names. University of California Press. . Accessed 2010-12-11.

External links
U.S. Forest Service – Hayfork Area
American Whitewater: Hayfork Creek
Middle Hayfork-Salt Creek Watershed Analysis
The Last Stand

Trinity River (California)
Rivers of Trinity County, California
Tributaries of the Klamath River
Shasta-Trinity National Forest
Rivers of Northern California